The women's long jump at the 2013 IPC Athletics World Championships was held at the Stade du Rhône from 20 to 29 July.

Medalists

See also
List of IPC world records in athletics

References

Long jump
2013 in women's athletics
Long jump at the World Para Athletics Championships